Granville Academy, formerly Granville Sports College is a comprehensive school on Burton Road (A511) in Woodville, Derbyshire maintained by the Derbyshire County Council. It is part of the De Ferrers Trust.

History
Granville received specialised Sports College status in January 2008. The county council was looking at a possible merger between the school and the William Allitt School. but this is no longer on the cards.

The school is near the very busy A511 road, which has been the scene of accidents some involving pupils. The traffic has increased since the Ashby-de-la-Zouch bypass opened in March 2002. Plans by the local council, Derbyshire County Council, aiming to improve road safety were rejected by Granville Academy with a spokesperson for the trust that runs Granville Academy suggesting this was because of "...concerns around site security and the safeguarding of its students".

The current principal for the school is Jo Kingswood, who replaced Sylvia Thomas.

Partner schools
Most of the school's students come from Belmont, Eureka, Hartshorne, Springfield, St. Edwards Netherseal and Woodville, primary schools but also accepts some children from Leicestershire into its 830 available places.

Academic performance
The school gets very good exam results for Derbyshire at GCSE, with very high results in the region and the highest between the three local schools in Swadlincote. Pingle and William Allit being those other schools. As of 2017, 69% of students achieved grade 4+ (previously grade C and above) at GCSE for both English and Maths. While 6% of students achieving the highest grade 9 (previously grade A**).

See also
 The Pingle Academy
The De Ferrers Academy

References

External links
 Granville Academy 
 School report 2008
 Politics Show February 2008
 Edubase

News items
 Three pupils expelled for drugs in July 2007

Secondary schools in Derbyshire
Academies in Derbyshire